The International Random Film Festival is the first film festival in the world which celebrates randomness in cinema. Out of the submission 25 films are selected to compete each year. The festival is organized annually in a randomly selected location, on a random opening date. Awards are given out randomly.

History 

The concept for the festival started as a breakfast-idea one summer morning in 2009 by Hannaleena Hauru (a filmmaker from Finland) and Synes Elischka (a media artist from Austria) – as a critique to the world wide short film festival network. The founders decided to start a film festival that gives an equal possibility to all the filmmakers to have their film screened internationally. The theoretical basis is to deconstruct the concept of a competition in quality.

The first edition for the festival in 2010 was promoted only by a Facebook group. The festival website has been running since April 2011.

Venues 
 2010: 1st edition, Wiesensteig, Germany, February 2010
 2011: 2nd edition, Bór Zapilski, Poland, July 2011
 2012: 3rd edition, Anija, Estonia, March 2012
 2013: 4th edition, Garpenberg, Sweden, December 2013 (opening night at Sagateatern in Hedemora)
 2014: 5th edition, Gdynia, Poland, November 2014
 2017: 6th edition, Helsinki, Finland, May 2017 (replacing the originally selected venue Al Hofuf, Saudi Arabia)

Every year the festival takes place on a randomly selected time, in a random venue. The location is selected by opening wikipedia.org and clicking Random article repeatedly, until reaching a page representing a place with a local population. The random selection methods are documented  on the website.

The date of the Festivals Opening Night is selected by using the True Random Number Generator at random.org.

External links 

  International Random Film Festival official website
  Article in Hufvudstadsbladet about the founder Hannaleena Hauru, and the 2nd Edition of the Festival in Bór Zapilski, Poland.
  Article about the festival's 2nd edition in Poland in onet.pl.
  Article and TV-spot on Television Silesia TVS, Poland.
  Radio Interview on Polskie Radio about the Random Film Festival, 10 July 2011.
  Article about the IRFF on Papo de Homem, a large online portal in Brasil, posted Jan. 8th 2012.
  CNN Article placing IRFF at #5 of the world's weirdest film festivals, posted Apr. 16th 2012.
  Article in the Regional Newspaper dt.se about the Random Film Festival in Garpenberg, Sweden, posted Oct. 25th 2013.

Annual events
Film festivals in Germany
Film festivals in Poland
Film festivals in Sweden
Short film festivals
2010 establishments in Germany
Film festivals established in 2010
Randomness